The FA Cup 1949–50 is the 69th season of the world's oldest football knockout competition; The Football Association Challenge Cup, or FA Cup for short. The large number of clubs entering the tournament from lower down the English football league system meant that the competition started with a number of preliminary and qualifying rounds. The 25 victorious teams from the Fourth Round Qualifying progressed to the First Round Proper.

Extra preliminary round

Ties

Replays

2nd replay

Preliminary round

Ties

Replays

2nd replay

1st qualifying round

Ties

Replays

2nd replays

2nd qualifying round

Ties

Replays

2nd replay

3rd qualifying round

Ties

Replays

4th qualifying round
The teams that entered in this round are: Leytonstone, Colchester United, Barnet, Bishop Auckland, Gillingham, Cheltenham Town, Guildford City, Chelmsford City, Gainsborough Trinity, Scunthorpe United, Shrewsbury Town, Scarborough, Stockton, Workington, Dulwich Hamlet, Walthamstow Avenue, Wellington Town, Runcorn, Stalybridge Celtic, Lancaster City, Dartford, Hereford United, Romford and Witton Albion.

Ties

Replays

2nd replay

1949–50 FA Cup
See 1949–50 FA Cup for details of the rounds from the First Round Proper onwards.

External links
 Football Club History Database: FA Cup 1949–50
 FA Cup Past Results

Qualifying
FA Cup qualifying rounds